Maxime Etuin (born 18 August 1995) is a French professional footballer who plays as a midfielder for Concarneau.

Career
Etuin begun his footballing training in his hometown of Quimper in France, and became an academy product of Stade Rennais F.C. After becoming unable to progress to Rennes' first team, he transferred to FC Lorient to continue his professional training. He made his professional debut for Lorient in a 4–1 Ligue 2 win over Gazélec Ajaccio on 13 January 2018.

Etuin joined Championnat National side Le Mans FC in August 2020, having been released by Lorient after the club's promotion to Ligue 1 in the 2019–20 season.

On 11 June 2021, he signed with Concarneau.

References

External links
 
 
 

1995 births
Living people
Sportspeople from Quimper
Association football midfielders
French footballers
Stade Rennais F.C. players
FC Lorient players
Le Mans FC players
US Concarneau players
Ligue 2 players
Championnat National players
Championnat National 2 players
Championnat National 3 players
Footballers from Brittany